Bo'ness Hospital is a community hospital in Dean Road, Bo'ness, Scotland. It is managed by NHS Forth Valley.

History
The facility was established as an infectious diseases hospital in 1910. It joined the National Health Service in 1948. A red brick health centre was built on the site in the 1970s. A modern community hospital, intended to provide psychiatry and services for elderly patients, was designed by Robert Paul and opened in 2004.

References

NHS Scotland hospitals
Hospital buildings completed in 1910
1910 establishments in Scotland
Hospitals established in 1910
Hospitals in Falkirk (council area)